Maria-Luisa Floro (born April 27, 1927) is a Filipino gymnast. She competed in at the 1964 Summer Olympics alongside Evelyn Magluyan. She is inducted in the Far Eastern University's Sports Hall of Fame.

References

1927 births
Living people
Filipino female artistic gymnasts
Olympic gymnasts of the Philippines
Gymnasts at the 1964 Summer Olympics
Place of birth missing (living people)